Protomolgula is a genus of ascidian tunicates in the family Molgulidae.

Species within the genus Protomolgula include:
 Protomolgula bythia Monniot F., 1971 
 Protomolgula cornuta Monniot & Monniot, 1991 
 Protomolgula triangularis Millar, 1982

References

Stolidobranchia
Tunicate genera